Palek, also known as paleg or mineovaheng, is a traditional Filipino alcoholic drink from the Batanes Islands made from fermented sugarcane juice. It is flavored with ebony bark (Diospyros ferrea), which turns the drink black. It is traditionally served in a halved coconut shell and passed from one person to the next.

See also
Basi
Intus

References

Fermented drinks
Philippine alcoholic drinks
Philippine cuisine